Khirbat Al-Lawz was a Palestinian Arab village in the Jerusalem Subdistrict. It was depopulated during the 1948 Arab-Israeli War on July 13, 1948, by the Har'el Brigade of Operation Dani. It was located 11 km west of Jerusalem, situated north of Wadi al-Sarar.

History

Ottoman era
In 1838, Khirbet el-Lauz was noted as a Muslim village, part of Beni Hasan area, located west of Jerusalem.

In 1863, Victor Guérin  found it to be a hamlet of eighty inhabitants, most of them shepherds.

Socin found from an official Ottoman  village list from about 1870 that   chirbet el-loz had a population of 83, with a total of 38 houses, though the population count included men, only. Hartmann found that  chirbet el-loz had 30 houses.

In 1883, the PEF's Survey of Western Palestine described Khurbet el Loz as "a village of moderate size on the slope of a high ridge near the summit. There are rock-cut tombs at the place."

British Mandate era
In the 1922 census of Palestine conducted by the British Mandate authorities, Kherbet al-Ley  had a population of 234 Muslims, increasing in the 1931 census to 315 Muslims, in 67 houses.

In the 1945 statistics, the village had a population of 450 Muslims, while the total land area was 4,502 dunams, according to an official land and population survey. Of this, 728 were used for plantations and irrigable land, 693 for cereals, while 13 dunams were classified as built-up areas.

Khirbat al-Lawz had a shrine dedicated to a local sage known as al-Shaykh Salama.

Post 1948
In 1992 the village site was described: "Grass and thorns grow among the stone rubble and terraces all across the site, as well as almond, fig, and carob trees. A thick forest of cypress and fir trees has been planted around the site. South of it, in the forest, is a well surrounded by several almond and fig trees. The forest is dedicated to the memory of Moshe Dayan, the Israeli general."

References

Bibliography

 
 
  

 
 
  (pp. 299–300)

 
 
  (p. 90)

External links
Welcome To Khirbat al-Lawz
Khirbat al-Lawz,  Zochrot
Survey of Western Palestine, Map 17:   IAA, Wikimedia commons 
Al-Lawz, Khirbat, from the Khalil Sakakini Cultural Center
 By Umar Agbariya, 7.6.2008, Zochrot

Arab villages depopulated during the 1948 Arab–Israeli War
District of Jerusalem